Štefanec may refer to:

Štefanec, Međimurje County, village in Croatia
Štefanec, Varaždin County, village in Croatia